Deborah Kaye Allen (born January 16, 1950) is an American actress, dancer, choreographer, singer-songwriter, director, producer, and a former member of the President's Committee on the Arts and Humanities. She has been nominated 20 times for an Emmy Award (winning five), two Tony Awards, and has also won a Golden Globe Award and received a star on the Hollywood Walk of Fame in 1991.

Allen is best known for her work in the musical-drama television series Fame (1982-1987), where she portrayed dance teacher Lydia Grant, and served as the series' principal choreographer. For this role in 1983 she received a Golden Globe Award for Best Actress – Television Series Musical or Comedy and two Primetime Emmy Award for Outstanding Choreography and was nominated for four Primetime Emmy Award for Outstanding Lead Actress in a Drama Series. Allen later began working as director and producer, most notably producing and directing 83 of 144 episodes of NBC comedy series A Different World (1988-1993). She returned to acting playing the leading role in the NBC sitcom In the House from 1995 to 1996, and in 2011 began playing Dr. Catherine Avery in the ABC medical drama Grey's Anatomy also serving as an executive producer/director. She has directed more than 50 television and film productions.

In 2001, Allen opened the Debbie Allen Dance Academy in Los Angeles, where she currently teaches young dancers. She also taught choreography to former Los Angeles Lakers dancer-turned-singer, Paula Abdul. She is the younger sister of actress/director/singer Phylicia Rashad.

Early life
Allen was born in Houston, Texas, the third child of orthodontist Andrew Arthur Allen and Pulitzer Prize-nominated artist, poet, playwright, scholar, and publisher, Vivian (née Ayers) Allen. She earned a B.A. degree in classical Greek literature, speech, and theater from Howard University and studied acting at HB Studio in New York City. She was a member of Chi Delta Mu Health Professional Fraternity. She holds honoris causa doctorates from Howard University and the University of North Carolina School of the Arts.

Challenges 
Debbie Allen auditioned at the Houston Ballet Academy at the age of twelve. She was denied admission. A year later, Allen was given another chance and admitted by a Russian instructor who accidentally saw Allen perform in a show. Once admission recruiters from the academy became aware of the situation, they allowed Allen to stay because they recognized her talent. While at the academy, she trained under Suzelle Poole.

Her experience at the Houston Ballet Academy is not the only time Allen was refused. When she was sixteen, she had a successful audition for the North Carolina School of the Arts, and was given an opportunity to demonstrate dance techniques to other prospective students applying to the institution. Unfortunately, Allen was refused admission, and was told her body was not suited for ballet.   After receiving numerous rejections, Allen decided to mainly focus on her academics and, from then on, was well on her way to the start of her acting career.

Career

1970–1981: Early works
Allen began her career appearing on Broadway theatre. Allen had her Broadway debut in the chorus of Purlie in 1970. She later created the role of Beneatha in the Tony Award-winning musical Raisin (1973), and appeared in Truckload, and Ain't Misbehavin'. In 1980, she received critical attention for her performance as Anita in the Broadway revival of West Side Story which earned her a Tony Award nomination for Best Featured Actress in a Musical and won her a Drama Desk Award.

In 1976, Allen made her television debut appearing in the CBS sitcom Good Times in a memorable 2-part episode titled "J.J.'s Fiancée" as J.J.'s drug-addicted fiancée, Diana. The following year, she went to star in the NBC variety show 3 Girls 3. Allen later was selected to appear in the 1979 miniseries Roots: The Next Generations by Alex Haley where she plays the wife of Haley. Also that year, she made her big screen debut appearing in a supporting role in the comedy film The Fish That Saved Pittsburgh. In 1981, she had the important role of Sarah, the lover of Coalhouse Walker (Howard E. Rollins) who is killed while trying to defend him in the movie version of the best-selling novel Ragtime. The same role earned a Tony Award for Audra McDonald, for her performance in the Broadway musical.

1982–1987: Fame

Allen was first introduced as Lydia Grant in the film Fame (1980). Although her role in the film was relatively small, Lydia became a central figure in the television adaptation, which ran from 1982 to 1987. During the opening montage of each episode, Grant told her students: "You've got big dreams? You want fame? Well, fame costs. And right here is where you start paying ... in sweat." Allen was nominated for the Emmy Award for Best Actress four times during the show's run. She is the only actress to have appeared in all three screen incarnations of Fame, playing Lydia Grant in both the 1980 film and 1982 television series and playing the school principal in the 2009 remake. Allen was also lead choreographer for the film and television series, winning two Primetime Emmy Award for Outstanding Choreography and one Golden Globe Award for Best Actress – Television Series Musical or Comedy. She became the first Black woman to win a Golden Globe for Best Actress in a Television Series—Musical or Comedy.

In 1986, Allen received a second Tony Award nomination, at that time for Best Actress in a Musical, for her performance in the title role of Bob Fosse's Sweet Charity. Also that year, she had a supporting role in the comedy-drama film Jo Jo Dancer, Your Life Is Calling directed, produced by and starring Richard Pryor.

1988–present
After Fame, Allen began focus on working as a choreographer and off-camera. She choreographed the 1988 Broadways adaptation of Stephen King’s “Carrie.” “Carrie” was a collaboration with her fellow “Fame” alumni Michael Gore, Dean Pitchford, and Gene Anthony Ray. The show opened to mixed reviews and closed after only 12 previews and 5 performances. But Allen’s choreography was as energetic and vibrant as it could possibly be.

In an article from the Museum of Broadcast Communications, The Hollywood Reporter commented on Allen's impact as the producer-director of the television series, A Different World. The show dealt with the life of students at the fictional historically black college, Hillman, and ran for six seasons on NBC. The Hollywood Reporter is quoted as stating that when Debbie Allen became the producer (and usually director) of A Different World after the first season, she transformed it "from a bland Cosby spin-off into a lively, socially responsible, ensemble situation comedy." She directed total 83 episodes.

Allen has released two solo albums, Sweet Charity (1986) and  Special Look (1989), which also produced several singles. Also that year, she directed musical film Polly. She later directed crime drama film Out-of-Sync (1995) and well as number of television films. She was choreographer of The Academy Awards Show for ten years, six of which were consecutive. In 1995, Allen lent her voice (as well directing the voice cast) to the children's animated series C Bear and Jamal for Film Roman and Fox Kids. Also that year, she went to star in the NBC sitcom In the House that ran two seasons. She co-produced the 1997 Steven Spielberg historical drama film Amistad receiving a Producers Guild of America Award.

In 2001, Allen founded the Debbie Allen Dance Academy, a 501(c)3 non profit organization. Since 2007, Allen was participated as a judge and mentor for the U.S. version of So You Think You Can Dance. She had to step aside at the end of Vegas week in Season 4 to avoid perception of bias, as one of her former dancers, Will, made it to the top 20.

In 2008, Allen directed the all-African-American Broadway production of Tennessee Williams' Pulitzer Prize-winning drama Cat on a Hot Tin Roof, starring stage veterans James Earl Jones (Big Daddy), her sister Phylicia Rashad (Big Mama) and Anika Noni Rose (Maggie the Cat), as well as film actor Terrence Howard, who made his Broadway debut as Brick. The production, with some roles recast, had a limited run (2009 – April 2010) in London. She also directed and starred in the 2001 play and its television adaptation The Old Settler.

In 2000s and 2010s, Allen directed television shows, including 44 episodes of All of Us, as well as Girlfriends, Everybody Hates Chris, How to Get Away with Murder, Empire, Scandal and Jane the Virgin. In 2011, she joined the cast of ABC medical drama Grey's Anatomy playing the role of Dr. Catherine Fox. As of 12th season, she served as an executive producer. In 2020, she directed the musical film Christmas on the Square starring Dolly Parton for Netflix.

Awards and honors
 Allen was appointed by President George W. Bush in 2001 as a member of the President's Committee on the Arts and Humanities.
 For her contributions to the television industry, Debbie Allen was honored in 1991 with a star on the Hollywood Walk of Fame at 6904 Hollywood Boulevard in the center of Hollywood directly opposite the Dolby Theatre at Hollywood & Highland Center.
 Allen was presented with the George and Ira Gershwin Award for Lifetime Musical Achievement, at the 1992 UCLA Spring Sing.
 Three-time Emmy Award winner for Choreography for the series Fame and The Motown 25th Anniversary Special.
 10 Image Awards as a director, actress, choreographer, and producer for Fame, A Different World, Motown 25, The Academy Awards, The Debbie Allen Special and Amistad.
 On February 4, 2009, Debbie Allen was honored for her contributions to dance and was presented with a Lifetime Achievement Award by Nia Peeples at The Carnival: Choreographer's Ball 10th anniversary show.
 Allen was awarded an honorary doctorate from the North Carolina School of the Arts, as well as from her alma mater, Howard University.
 2020 Kennedy Center Honoree
 On September 19, 2021, Allen received the Television Academy’s 2021 Governors Award at the 73rd Primetime Emmy Awards.

Personal life
Allen is married to former NBA player Norm Nixon; the couple have three children: dancer Vivian Nichole Nixon (who played Kalimba in the Broadway production of Hot Feet) basketball player Norman Ellard Nixon Jr. (Wofford College & Southern University), and DeVaughn Nixon. Allen was previously married to Win Wilford from 1975 to 1983. She is the sister of actress/director/singer Phylicia Rashad (she guest starred in an episode of The Cosby Show & Rashad in an episode of In the House and also Greys Anatomy), Tex Allen (Andrew Arthur Allen III, born 1945), a jazz composer, and Hugh W. Allen, a real estate banker, who appeared on three episodes of A Different World as Quincy Tolleson.

Filmography

Film

Television

Director

Writer
 Movement magazine, regular columnist since 2006
 Dancing in the Wings paperback, by Debbie Allen (Author), Kadir Nelson (Illustrator)

Discography 
 Special Look (1989)

References

External links 

 
  (archive)
 
 
 
 

1950 births
Living people
20th-century American actresses
21st-century American actresses
Actresses from Houston
African-American female dancers
African-American dancers
African-American actresses
African-American television directors
African-American television producers
African-American choreographers
American choreographers
American female dancers
Dancers from Texas
American film actresses
American stage actresses
American television actresses
American television directors
Television producers from Texas
American women television producers
American women choreographers
Best Musical or Comedy Actress Golden Globe (television) winners
Drama Desk Award winners
American voice directors
Howard University alumni
Primetime Emmy Award winners
University of California, Los Angeles faculty
American women television directors
20th-century African-American women
20th-century African-American people
21st-century African-American women
21st-century African-American people
African-American history of Westchester County, New York
Kennedy Center honorees